These are the nationwide via satellite-reach TV and Radio stations of the Radio Philippines Network (CNN Philippines).

RPN stations nationwide

RPN owned and operated stations
List as of March 16, 2015:

Analog

Digital

RPN Affiliate stations

RPN Radio stations

See also
CNN Philippines
Radio Philippines Network
Nine Media Corporation

References

Radio Philippines Network
Philippine television-related lists